Ikast Stadion, known as Wunderelf Arena for sponsorship reasons, is a multi-use stadium in Ikast, Denmark. It is currently used mostly for football matches and is the home stadium of Ikast FC and it also hosts selected matches of the FC Midtjylland Academy. The stadium holds 12,750 people.

External links
Entry at Stadions.dk

Ikast FS
Football venues in Denmark
Ikast-Brande Municipality
Buildings and structures in the Central Denmark Region